Khadija Mohammad (born 19 June 1995 in Dubai, United Arab Emirates) is an Emirati weightlifter. She competed at the 2012 Summer Olympics in the -75 kg event and finished in 9th place.

References 

1995 births
Living people
Emirati female weightlifters
Olympic weightlifters of the United Arab Emirates
Weightlifters at the 2012 Summer Olympics